Freeman High School is a public high school north of Rockford, Washington and  southwest of Spokane, Washington. It is a part of the adjacent three school Freeman School District facility that contains Freeman Elementary School, Freeman Middle School and Freeman High School.

Athletics
Freeman high school competes in Washington's Northeast A League. The school fields teams in the following sports:
 Fall: Cross Country, Football, Soccer, Volleyball
 Winter: Wrestling, Basketball
 Spring: Baseball, Golf, Softball, Tennis and Track & Field

Freeman's athletic teams are known as the Scotties. The elementary and middle schools were known as the Freeman Raiders until 2014. The original old Scottie dog logo was created by Freeman student Margee Noble.

History
The Freeman school district was formed in 1955 as a consolidation of the Rockford, Lindbergh, and Sunnyside school districts; there had been another Freeman school district prior to 1940, when it was annexed by Lindbergh.

2017 shooting
On September 13, 2017, a gunman opened fire at Freeman. The assailant, then 15-year-old sophomore Caleb Sharpe, brought two guns, an AR-15 rifle and a Colt 1903 pistol then killed one student, who was attempting to prevent the shooting from taking place. Three other students were injured and taken to the hospital. Sharpe was tried as an adult, and his trial date was set for October 5, 2020, but had been pushed back to June 2021, due to COVID-19. The trial was again been pushed back to January 2022; however, Sharpe pled guilty before the trial began. On August 19, Sharpe was sentenced to 40 years to life in prison.

Demographics

The demographic breakdown of the 317 students enrolled in 20192020 was:
 Male – 53.8%
 Female – 46.2%
 Native American/Alaskan – 3.1%
 Asian/Pacific islanders – 2.4%
 Black – 1.2%
 Hispanic – 5.8%
 White – 85.6%
 Multiracial – 1.9%

22.3 percent of the students were eligible for free or reduced lunch.

References

External links 

 

High schools in Spokane County, Washington
Public high schools in Washington (state)
Mass shootings in the United States